Yoo Won-jeong is a South Korean paralympic boccia player. He participated at the 2016 Summer Paralympics in the boccia competition, being awarded the bronze medal in the individual BC1 event.

References

External links 
Paralympic Games profile

Living people
Place of birth missing (living people)
Year of birth missing (living people)
South Korean boccia players
Boccia players at the 2016 Summer Paralympics
Medalists at the 2016 Summer Paralympics
Paralympic medalists in boccia
Paralympic boccia players of South Korea
Paralympic bronze medalists for South Korea
21st-century South Korean people